8-bit computing is computing with 8-bit addresses or units of data.

8-bit may also refer to:

Technology
 Octet (computing), a unit of information that consists of eight bits
 Byte, a unit of information that commonly consists of eight bits
 8bit, a MIME encoding
 8-bit era, in the history of video game consoles
 8-bit color, in computer graphics
 8-bit sound

Other uses
 8-bit (music), synthesized electronic music in a style that imitates 8-bit era sound
 8-Bit (studio), a Japanese animation studio
 8-BIT, a character from the video game Brawl Stars

See also
 8-bit clean, a computer system that correctly handles 8-bit character encodings
 Bit (disambiguation)